Mina Santa Teresita is a village and municipality in Río Negro Province in Eashan Village.

References

Populated places in Río Negro Province